The following highways are numbered 568:

United States
  Maryland Route 568
  Ohio State Route 568
  Pennsylvania Route 568
  Puerto Rico Highway 568